Miguel McCormick (born c. 1900) was an Argentine rugby union player. He played as flanker for Pacific Rugby A.C. (current Ferrocarril San Martín), and the Argentina national team.

Career 
McCormick was born in Buenos Aires to a family of Irish origin. He began his rugby playing career for Pacific Railway Athletic Club. McCormick was captain of the first team for over 12 years and coach of all divisions.

McCormick made his debut playing for the Argentina national rugby union team on July 31, 1927, against Great Britain.

Gallery

References

External links 
clubsanmartin.org
en.espn.co.uk
www.pacificrugby.com.ar

1900s births
Argentine people of Irish descent
Rugby union players from Buenos Aires
Argentina international rugby union players
Argentine rugby union players
Year of death missing
Rugby union flankers
Río de la Plata